The Women's Saikyo (Strongest) is a Go competition. The tournament was discontinued in 2008. In 2016, the tournament restarted with new sponsor, SENKO Co., Ltd.

Outline
The Women's Saikyo was sponsored by Tokyo Seimitsu up to 2008. The winner's purse was 4,500,000 yen ($42,000).

In 2016, the tournament got new sponsor and restarted its cycle. The official name for the new tournament is Senko Cup Female Saikyo. The winner's purse is ¥8,000,000, while the runner up gets ¥4,500,000. The thinking time was 3 hours with 5 minutes byo-yomi. Hsieh Yimin won the first edition by beating Chiaki Mukai in the final.

Past winners

Senko Cup

References

Go competitions in Japan